Satarop was an Iranian king who ruled Parthia. He was possibly first a vassal of the Kushan Empire, and by the time the Sasanian ruler Ardashir I had begun to conquer Iran, he acknowledged the latter's authority. Nothing more is known about him.

Sources 
 

3rd-century Iranian people
Year of death unknown
Date of birth unknown
3rd-century monarchs in the Middle East
3rd-century deaths
Vassal rulers of the Sasanian Empire